Kiruna Church is a church building in Kiruna, Sweden, and is one of Sweden's largest wooden buildings. The church exterior is built in a Gothic Revival style, while the altar is in Art Nouveau.

In 2001, Kiruna Church was voted the most popular pre-1950 building in Sweden, in a country-wide poll conducted by the Swedish Travelling Exhibitions, a government agency connected to the Ministry of Culture. It is considered to be "the Shrine of the Nomadic people."

Because of the expansion of the Kiruna Mine, the church is slated to be moved to a location adjacent to the cemetery in 2025 or 2026.

History

The church was built between 1909 and 1912, and consecrated by Bishop Olof Bergqvist on 8 December 1912. Since 1913, the church has been included in the Jukkasjärvi parish in the diocese of Luleå. Gustaf Wickman was the church's architect and the famous altarpiece is a work of Prince Eugen, Duke of Närke.

References

External links

Jukkasjärvi Parish 

Kiruna
20th-century Church of Sweden church buildings
Churches in Norrbotten County
Art Nouveau church buildings in Sweden
Churches completed in 1912
Churches in the Diocese of Luleå